Aanazhagan is a 1995 Indian Tamil-language comedy film directed by Thiagarajan and produced by S. Balaji. The film stars Prashanth, newcomer Suneha, Vadivelu, Charle, and Chinni Jayanth, while K. R. Vijaya, Gandhimathi, and Vaishnavi play supporting roles. It is a remake of the Telugu film Chitram Bhalare Vichitram. The music was composed by Ilaiyaraaja. In the film, Prashanth disguises himself as a woman in order to convince the landlady.

Plot 
Raja, Sudhakar, Raghava and Marudhu are good friends who stay together as tenants at a rented house. After being thrown out, they start searching for a new house on rent, but no one is willing to give their house for bachelors. Finally, they come to know a landlady in search of a family as her tenants. A plot is hatched by, and all four bachelors dress up to be a family man (Sudhakar), his retarded brother (Raghava), his uncle (Marudhu), and his wife Lakshmi (Raja). Now, Raja's lady love Priya (Suneha) happens to be the landlady's daughter. At one point of time by mistake, the friends inform the landlady that Lakshmi is pregnant. The landlady arranges for Valaikaapu function, followed by a doctor checkup. This bursts into a series of rumbled conflicts, and all hell breaks loose.

Cast 

Prashanth as Raja and Rajalakshmi alias Lucky
Suneha (Debut) as Priya
Vadivelu as Marudhu
Charle as Sudhakar
Chinni Jayanth as Raghava
K. R. Vijaya as Landlady
Gandhimathi as House Owner
Vaishnavi as Doctor
Manivannan
Delhi Ganesh
Vennira Aadai Moorthy
Loose Mohan
Dhamu
V. K. Ramasamy
Oru Viral Krishna Rao
Kumarimuthu as Landlady's Servant
'Bayilvan' Ranganathan
Kazan Khan

Production 
T. K. Rajendran was initially supposed to direct this film since he fell down and got hit hard, he was replaced by Thyagarajan. Prashanth appeared in drag role in Aanazhagan and noted the most daunting aspects of the role were the "waxing, the threading, the works" as well as "wearing a sari in summer, doing a bharatanatya sequence in a woman's costume, and getting the nuances and variations right were the other challenges", revealing his mum had assisted him. The actor was also involved in the production of the film. The voice for Prashanth's female character Rajalakshmi was given by the famous dubbing artiste Anuradha. The film became the first project to have scenes shot in the newly created JJ Studios in 1995.

Soundtrack 

The film score and the soundtrack were composed by Ilaiyaraaja and lyrics were written by Vaali.

Release 
The film performed well at the box office. Soon after the film's release, Thiagarajan and Prashanth began working on another project titled Padagotti Babu, which eventually did not develop. Likewise, another production by his father during the period, Pulithevan co-starring Manisha Koirala and Sangita, was also stalled.

References

External links 
 

1990s Tamil-language films
1995 comedy films
1995 films
Cross-dressing in Indian films
Films scored by Ilaiyaraaja
Indian comedy films
Tamil remakes of Telugu films